Granville Seward Austin (1927 – 6 July 2014) was an American historian of the Indian Constitution.

Education
Austin received most of his early education at Norwich, Vermont, USA. Austin graduated from Dartmouth College with a BA in American Literature. He then earned a doctorate in Modern Indian History from Oxford University.

Career
He worked as a journalist/photographer and later served with the U. S. Information Service, Department of State, Department of Health, Education and Welfare, and on the staff of a U. S. senator. He has held fellowships or grants from St. Antony's College, Oxford, the Ford Foundation, the Fulbright Program, the American Institute of Indian Studies, the Rockefeller Foundation, the Woodrow Wilson International Center for Scholars, the Rajiv Gandhi Foundation, and the Institute of Current World Affairs.

Austin was the author of two seminal political histories of the constitution of India, The Indian Constitution: Cornerstone of a Nation and Working a Democratic Constitution: The Indian Experience.

He died on 6 July 2014

Awards
In 2011, in recognition for his writing on the framing and working of the Indian Constitution, Granville Austin was awarded a Padma Shri award, the fourth highest civilian honor of the Republic of India. National Translation Mission of the Ministry of Human Resource Development of the Government of India has selected The Indian Constitution: Cornerstone of a Nation for translation into Indian languages. The book has already been published in Telugu, Marathi, Punjabi, Odia, Hindi  and Malayalam languages.

Bibliography
The Indian Constitution: Cornerstone of a Nation
Working a Democratic Constitution: The Indian Experience
Retrieving Times (White River Press, 2008)

References

1927 births
2014 deaths
Recipients of the Padma Shri in literature & education
American historians